Rokytov pri Humennom is a village and municipality in Humenné District in the Prešov Region of north-east Slovakia.

History
In historical records the village was first mentioned in 1463.

Geography
The municipality lies at an altitude of 238 metres and covers an area of 25.683 km2.
It has a population of about 308 people.

References

External links
 
 
http://www.statistics.sk/mosmis/eng/run.html

Villages and municipalities in Humenné District
Zemplín (region)